Steve Hanley may refer to:
Steve Hanley (musician) (born 1959), Irish-born English musician, long term bassist with The Fall
Steve Hanley (rugby union) (born 1979), English rugby union player